The Australian Film Critics Association (AFCA), formerly Melbourne Film Critics' Forum, is an Australian professional association for film critics, reviewers and journalists who work in the media, based in Melbourne. It is a member of the International Federation of Film Critics (FIPRESCI).

History
Formed in 1996, AFCA began as the Melbourne Film Critics' Forum, expanding to a national organisation in 2004. In the same year, AFCA became an Australian representative of the International Federation of Film Critics (FIPRESCI), which comprises the national organisations of professional film critics and film journalists from around the world. FIPRESCI has members in more than 50 countries worldwide. AFCA helped to establish the first FIPRESCI jury at the Adelaide Film Festival.

AFCA's members, several of whom contribute to internationally recognised media outlets, are professional film critics, film reviewers and film journalists, from all media forums, who provide informed discussion, analysis and comment on Australian and world cinema. Here are some of them: Adam Ross, Lachlan Marks, Alan James, Laura Bennett, Alex Thomas, Lawrence Barber, Alexandra Heller-Nicholas, Lee Zachariah, Lisa Thatcher, Ashley Beks, Luke Buckmaster, Marcella Papandrea, Bede Jermyn, Madeleine Swain, Mark Lavercombe, Cameron Williams, Matthew Toomey, Carol Van Opstal, Nicholas Brodie, Paul Turner, Peter Krausz, Richard Alaba, David O'Connell, etc. The body supports both mainstream and independent cinema and highlights significant or challenging films.

Film awards

On 22 January 2008, AFCA announced the results of its inaugural Film Awards for 2007. The awards span four categories comprising Best Australian Film, Best Overseas Film, Best Documentary and Best Unreleased Film (in Australia at the time of the awards). The winning and commended films granted AFCA film awards are:

In 2011 acting awards were introduced and the Best Unreleased Film category was discontinued.

Writing awards
In conjunction with its 2009 film awards, AFCA announced the results of its inaugural writing awards. The categories and winners are:

See also
List of film awards

References

External links

Australian film critics associations
1996 establishments in Australia